James Barrie Sikking (born March 5, 1934) is an American former actor, most known for his role as Lt. Howard Hunter on the 1980s TV series Hill Street Blues.

Early years 
Sikking was born in Los Angeles on March 5, 1934 to Andy and Sue (née Paxton) Sikking. His mother co-founded Santa Monica's Unity-by-the-Sea Church. He graduated from UCLA in 1959 and attended the University of Hawaii. He has two brothers, Tom and Art, and a sister, Joy.

Career 
Sikking starred on the ABC TV series Doogie Howser, M.D. as Dr. David Howser and on the 1997 drama series Brooklyn South as Captain Stan Jonas. Sikking appeared as Sergeant (later promoted to Lieutenant) Howard Hunter on Hill Street Blues from 1981 to 1987. He also portrayed Geoffrey St. James on the NBC comedy Turnabout and  voiced General Gordon on the short-lived 1998 cartoon series Invasion America. He is often credited as James B. Sikking, and was sometimes credited as "Jim Sikking" in some of his earlier roles on film and TV.

His film work includes The Competition, Outland, Up the Creek, 
Star Trek III: The Search for Spock and Narrow Margin, as well as a minor (but crucial) part, as a cynical hitman, in the earlier Point Blank. Sikking's film career started in 1955. Sikking starred in the 1992 TV movie Doing Time on Maple Drive. He has made guest appearances on many TV series including Perry Mason, Rawhide, The Fugitive, Bonanza, The Outer Limits, General Hospital, Here Come the Brides, The Rockford Files, The Bob Newhart Show, Hogan's Heroes, Rich Man, Poor Man Book II, Hunter and Batman Beyond.

Personal life 
He has been married to his second wife, cookbook author Florine Sikking ( Caplan), since 1962. They have 3 children.

Filmography

Five Guns West (1955) as Union Sergeant (uncredited)
Perry Mason (1961) "The Case of the Misguided  Missle" Civilian Engineer Bert Springer
Combat (1963) “The Long Way Home” as American POW
The Outer Limits (1963–1964, TV Series) as Botany / Orderly
The Strangler (1964) as Police Sketch Artist
The Carpetbaggers (1964) as Reporter (uncredited)
The Fugitive (1964–1966, TV Series) as Deputy Marsh / Bert / Leonard Taft
Von Ryan's Express (1965) as American Soldier (uncredited)
Sail to Glory (1967) as George Steers
In Like Flint (1967) as Secret Service Man (uncredited)
Point Blank (1967) as Hired Gun
The Invaders (1967, TV Series) as Human Capt. William Taft
Gomer Pyle, U.S.M.C. (1967) (TV) as Colonel Richardson
Adam-12 (1968) (TV – Season 1, Episode 8) as Tex
Hogan's Heroes (1968) (TV – Season 4, Episode 10) as Private Berger
Hogan's Heroes (1969) (TV – Season 4, Episode 18) as Gestapo Officer
Charro! (1969) as Gunner
Daddy's Gone A-Hunting (1969) as Joe Menchell
The Night God Screamed (1971) as Deacon Paul
Escape from the Planet of the Apes (1971) as Control Room Officer (uncredited)
Chandler (1971) as Bogardy (scenes deleted)
The Magnificent Seven Ride! (1972) as Andy Hayes
Mission Impossible (1972) as Wilson / TV Series Episode: "Committed"
The New Centurions (1972) as Sgt. Anders
Family Flight (1972) (TV) as Second Controller
General Hospital (1973–1976, TV Series) as Dr. James Hobart
MASH (1973, TV Series, Season 1 - Episode 15, “Tuttle”) as Finance Office
Scorpio (1973) as Harris
Brother on the Run (1973) as Lt Summers
The President's Plane is Missing (1973) as Aide to Dunbar
Columbo: Publish or Perish (1974) as Policeman in office (uncredited)
The Terminal Man (1974) as Ralph Friedman
Ellery Queen, "The Adventure of the Sinister Scenario" (1976) as Mike Hewitt
The Feather and Father Gang (1977) (TV) as Bricklaw
Little House on the Prairie (1977) (TV) as Mr. Franklin
Hawaii Five-O (1977) "Tread the King's Shadow" as George Cameron
A Woman Called Moses (1978) (TV) as McCracken
Capricorn One* (1978) as Control Room Man
Hawaii Five-O (1978) "The Miracle Man" as Oscar Ross
The Electric Horseman (1979) as Dietrich
Ordinary People (1980) as Ray
The Competition (1980) as Brudenell
Hill Street Blues (1981–1987, TV Series) as Lt. Howard Hunter
Outland* (1981) as Sgt. Montone 
The Star Chamber* (1983) as Dr. Harold Lewin
Up the Creek (1984) as Tozer
Star Trek III: The Search for Spock (1984) as Captain Styles 
Morons from Outer Space (1985) as Col. Raymond Laribee, CIA
Dress Gray (1986) (TV) as Maj. Clifford Bassett
Soul Man (1986) as Bill Watson 
Ollie Hopnoodle's Haven of Bliss (1988) (TV) as Old Man
Around the World in 80 Days (1989, starring Pierce Brosnan) as Jenks
Doogie Howser (1989–1993) (TV) as Dr. David Howser
Narrow Margin* (1990) as Nelson 
Final Approach (1991) as Col. Jason Halsey
Doing Time on Maple Drive (1992) (TV) as Phil Carter 
The Pelican Brief (1993) as FBI Director Denton Voyles 
Dead Badge (1994) as Wheeler / Aaron Feld
In Pursuit of Honor (1995) (TV) as General Douglas MacArthur
Tyson (1995) (TV) as Bill Clayton
Whisper of the Heart (1995) as Seiya Tsukishima (English version, voice)
Submerged (2001) (TV) as Rear Admiral Cyrus Cole 
Fever Pitch (2005) as Doug Meeks
Made of Honor (2008) as Reverend Foote
American Primitive (2008) as William Cauldicott
Just an American (2012) as Dr. Hanover
The Closer (2012) as Judge Edward Crosby

* – directed by Peter Hyams

References

External links
 
 
 

1934 births
20th-century American male actors
21st-century American male actors
American male film actors
American male television actors
American male voice actors
El Segundo High School alumni
Living people
Male actors from Los Angeles
People from Brentwood, Los Angeles
UCLA Film School alumni